The England Masters is a darts tournament that has been held annually since 2009.

List of winners

Men's

Women's

Tournament records
 Most wins 2:  John Walton. 
 Most Finals 2:  John Walton,  Gary Robson. 
 Most Semi Finals 3:  Darryl Fitton.
 Most Quarter Finals 3:  Darryl Fitton, Gary Robson,  Robbie Green,  Scott Mitchell,  Tony Randell .
 Most Appearances 7:  Darryl Fitton.
 Most Prize Money won £3,275:  John Walton.
 Best winning average (96.12) :  Scott Mitchell v's  Dean Reynolds, 2015, Final.
 Youngest Winner age 26:   Daryl Gurney. 
 Oldest Winner age 49:  John Walton.

See also 
List of BDO ranked tournaments
List of WDF tournaments

References

2009 establishments in England
Darts tournaments